The Connecticut State Universities (CSU) are part of the Connecticut State Colleges & Universities, the largest public higher education system in Connecticut, and the second largest in New England. The four comprehensive state universities enroll almost 35,000 students and 180,000 alumni. The first of the universities to be founded was Central Connecticut State University, established in 1849 as a normal school for teacher education. Over time the other three institutions were founded as normal schools and in 1959 they were converted into state colleges to reflect their expanded mission. From their founding until 1965, they were overseen by the Connecticut State Department of Education.  In 1965 the General Assembly transferred control of the then-colleges to an independent Board of Trustees. In 1983, the four institutions were converted into universities, together constituting the Connecticut State University System.

The universities are governed by the Connecticut Board of Regents for Higher Education, established in 2011 to license and accredit the institutions and their programs, approve budgets, support planning, and coordinate technology operations. The president of the Board is Mark E. Ojakian. The Connecticut State University System Foundation, provides financial support from private donations to assist the missions of the universities.

The system publishes a regular magazine, Universe, highlighting the academic and civic initiatives of the universities, and a semi-annual journal of contemporary literature and essays known as the Connecticut Review that was founded in 1967 by the Board of Trustees.

The four universities – Central, Eastern, Southern and Western – offer graduate and undergraduate programs in more than 160 subject areas.  Ninety-three percent of students are in-state residents and 86% of system graduates reside in Connecticut after graduation. The universities have experienced steady growth in recent years, as full-time enrollment is currently at an all-time high, and overall enrollment is at the highest level in the past two decades.

Campuses

History
Central Connecticut is the oldest public institution of higher education in Connecticut. It was established in 1849 as a "normal school", an institution whose sole purpose was to train teachers. The three other CSU institutions also were established as normal schools: Eastern Connecticut in 1889, Southern Connecticut State University in 1893 and Western Connecticut in 1903.

In 1959, the four institutions were renamed "state colleges" to reflect their expanded curricula and missions.

Twenty-four years later, in 1983, the colleges became universities in recognition of their greater mission and strategies. Today, the Connecticut State University System is the largest public university system in Connecticut.

From 1849 to 1965, the four institutions were administered by the Connecticut State Department of Education. On July 30, 1965, the state General Assembly created the Board of Trustees to oversee the colleges and to guide them to more effectively to serve the public. The Connecticut State University System was established in 1983, bringing together the four state universities under a single Board of Trustees.

Public Act 11–48 and Public Act 11–61 enacted in 2011 consolidated governance under the Connecticut Board of Regents for Higher Education, which serves as the Board of Trustees when required under statute. The Connecticut University System remains a legal entity under Connecticut law, but the four institutions are considered to be a part of the larger system of the Connecticut State Colleges and Universities (ConnSCU).

See also
List of colleges and universities in Connecticut
Connecticut Community Colleges
University of Connecticut

References

External links

Catalog of the CSU Libraries and Connecticut State Library

 
Public university systems in the United States
Public education in Connecticut

.
Educational institutions established in 1849
1849 establishments in Connecticut